Virgin Trains may refer to:

United States train operator
Brightline, a rail system in Florida, United States that was previously known as Virgin Trains USA

United Kingdom train operators
Virgin Rail Group, holding company for the Virgin Group's rail franchises in the United Kingdom
Virgin CrossCountry, the former operator of the CrossCountry rail franchise in the United Kingdom
Virgin Trains East Coast, the former operator of the InterCity East Coast rail franchise in the United Kingdom
Virgin Trains ExpressCoach, a former coach brand in England owned by the Virgin Rail Group
Virgin Trains West Coast, the former operator of the InterCity West Coast rail franchise in the United Kingdom.

Trains
Virgin Azuma, marketing name for the British Rail Class 800 and British Rail Class 801 trains
Virgin Pendolino, marketing name for the British Rail Class 390 trains
Virgin Super Voyager, marketing name for the British Rail Class 221 trains
Virgin Voyager, marketing name for the British Rail Class 220 trains